Monaco competed at the 2022 Winter Olympics in Beijing, China, from 4 to 20 February 2022.

Monaco's team consisted of three male athletes competing in two sports. Alpine skier Arnaud Alessandria was named as the flagbearer for the opening ceremony. Meanwhile a volunteer was the flagbearer during the closing ceremony.

Competitors
The following is the list of number of competitors participating at the Games per sport/discipline.

Alpine skiing

By meeting the basic qualification standards, Monaco qualified one male alpine skier.

Bobsleigh 

Based on their rankings in the 2021–22 Bobsleigh World Cup, Monaco qualified 1 sled in the two-man event. The Monegasque sledfinished in sixth place, the highest finish for the country at the Olympics.

* – Denotes the driver of each sled

References

Nations at the 2022 Winter Olympics
2022
Winter Olympics